Margaret A. Wilcox (1838 - ?) was an American mechanical engineer and inventor known for developing a car heater design. She is also credited for patenting several inventions.

Biography 
Margaret Wilcox, born in 1838, was a mechanical engineer from Chicago, Illinois. Wilcox developed a car heater.

Wilcox had developed other patented inventions and designs, such as a machine that combined and performed two tasks which was able to wash both clothes and dishes at once, she classified it as a combined clothes-and-dishwasher in 1890. This machine involved two bowls, a smaller bowl being moved around inside a larger bowl. Wilcox also developed a combined cooking and hot water heating stove, which is designed to save fuel through a furnace that  utilized the wasted heat of the stove. By the time this occurred it was still illegal for women to file a patent under their name; Margaret Wilcox consequently filed the patent under her husband’s name. These products did not succeed. It is suggested that she founded Wilcox Company sometime in 1892 for the purpose of marketing her inventions.

By 1883, Margaret Wilcox lost her husband. In November 28, 1893 she applied for a patent for her car heater idea. Wilcox presented this work at the World’s Columbian Fair in 1893, the year in which Chicago had the right to host the fair. Wilcox's design moved the heat produced by the combustion engines in automobiles by running a channel of air along the engine, and as a result warming up the car. One concerns of the car heater was the inability for people to control the level of heat. This meant that warmth within the vehicle would continuously increase once the ride begun, since there was no way of regulating the temperature levels thus raising danger. Wilcox’s design was used in the engineering process.

Legacy 
Heater installation first began by 1917 in which engineers followed the car heater design. Twelve years later, Margaret Wilcox’s design was installed in Ford vehicles. Other motor companies further engineered and installed car heaters.

Honors 
In 2020, Inventor's Digest named Wilcox's patent for car heater one of their top ten patents by women.

References 

1838 births
Women inventors
Women engineers
Year of death missing
People from Chicago
19th-century women engineers